Conquistador is the ninth album by Canadian jazz trumpeter Maynard Ferguson on Columbia Records. The album is notable for its inclusion of the hit single "Gonna Fly Now (Theme from "Rocky")".

Background and production

After the experience of creating Primal Scream without his touring band, Ferguson was determined to see them become an integral part of his next effort. While Bob James was firmly in control of the production, Ferguson was insistent that his band members would be a part of the proceedings. It became a bi-coastal effort, with the touring band recording in San Francisco between dates, and the James crew recording in New York. Two of the songs were recorded entirely in New York without any participation by Ferguson's band: the themes from Star Trek and Rocky.

"Gonna Fly Now"

While Ferguson was known to have an uncanny ability to change with the times, no one suspected that in the Spring of 1977, he would pull off the coup of his life. As AllMusic reviewer Richard Ginell put it: "Maynard was shrewd, and Maynard was quick, and he managed to beat almost everyone to the punch..."

It had been decades since a big band recording had made the charts, but when he released his recording ahead of the soundtrack version, Ferguson scored the biggest hit of his long career. The recording had a 13-week run on Billboard's Hot 100 chart, eventually peaking at number 28 on June 25. It's likely that Ferguson's recording paved the way for the success of the soundtrack version (Bill Conti's own recording would peak at number one the following week). Gonna Fly Now is also unique in that it had recordings by four different artists charting at the same time (Ferguson, Conti, Rhythm Heritage and Current).

Critical reception

Conquistador was the most successful album of Ferguson's career, earning him his first and only gold record, and a Grammy nomination (Best Pop Instrumental Performance) for "Gonna Fly Now (Theme from "Rocky")". Boosted by the popularity of the single, Conquistador not only went to number one on the Jazz charts, but it became the first big band album to appear on the pop charts in decades, sparking a revival of interest in big band music.

When Conquistador rose to number 22 on the pop album charts, noted Los Angeles Times music critic Leonard Feather noted "Conquistador earned Ferguson a unique place in the big band world: he alone was able to crack the pop charts."

Reissues
In 2003, Conquistador was reissued by Columbia/Legacy along with 1974's Chameleon, both with remastered sound and new essays.

Trivia

Maynard Ferguson's arrangement of "Gonna Fly Now" was used for the opening of the Toronto newscast CityPulse from the early 1980s into the 1990s (with newer arrangements keeping the same melody used until the mid 2000s).

Maynard Ferguson's arrangement of "Theme from Star Trek" was used as the opening for The Larry King Show talk radio program on the Mutual Radio Network, focusing on the recording improvisations rather than the main melody, although the piece in full could be heard on occasion at the close of his program. Jay Chattaway, who produced the album and worked on most of the arrangements on the album, would go on to compose music scores for Star Trek: The Next Generation and its respected spinoffs; Deep Space Nine and Voyager, along with the prequel Enterprise.

Track listing 
All songs arranged and conducted by Jay Chattaway except Soar Like an Eagle by Bob James. All trumpet solos by Maynard Ferguson except where noted.

 Times shown are the correct original LP lengths.

Personnel

The MF Band
 Alto & Soprano saxophone: Mike Migliore
 Tenor & Soprano Saxophone: Mark Colby
 Baritone saxophone & Flute: Bobby Militello
 Trumpets: Stan Mark, Dennis Noday, Joe Mosello (credited as Guiseppe [sic] Loon P. Mosello), Ron Tooley
 Trombones: Randy Purcell, Roger Homefield
 Drums: Peter Erskine
 Bass: Gordon Johnson
 Keyboards: Biff Hannon
 Sound: Tony Romano

Guest musicians
 Guitar: George Benson
 Keyboards: Bob James

Additional players
 Guitars: George Benson, Jeff Layton, Eric Gale, Lance Quinn
 Keyboards: Kenny Ascher
 Bass: Gary King, Will Lee
 Drums: Harvey Mason, Allan Schwartzberg
 Percussion: Ralph MacDonald
 Parade Drum: Phil Kraus
 Alto Saxophone: George Young
 Tenor Saxophone: Joe Farrell
 Trumpet: Jon Faddis, Marvin Stamm, Randy Brecker, Alan Rubin, Bernie Glow, Marky Markowitz, Jim Bossy
 Trombone: Wayne Andre, Paul Faulise, Dave Taylor, Julian Preister
 French Horn: Brooks Tillotson, Donald Corrado
 Vocals: Patti Austin, Lani Groves, Gwen Guthrie, Linda November, Ellen Bernfield, Vivian Cherry, Richard Berg, Martin Nelson
 Strings: Alfred Brown, Harry Cykman, Max Ellen, Paul Gershman, Harold Kohon, Charles Libove, Harry Lookofsky, Charles McCracken, Marvin Morgenstern, David Nadien, Eugene Noye, Max Pollikoff, Matthew Raimondi, Albert Scheonmaker, Alan Shulman, Richard Sortomme, Emanuel Vardi

Production
 Producer: Jay Chattaway
 Executive Producer: Bob James
 Engineer: Joe Jorgensen
 Mastering Engineer: Vladimir Meller
 Cover Painting: John Collier
 Design: Paula Scher
 Photography: Tom Copi
 Art Direction: Howard Fritzson

Reissue
 Producer: Bob Belden
 Mastering Engineer: Mark Wilder, Seth Foster
 Legacy A&R: Steve Berkowitz
 Project Director: Seth Rothstein
 Photography: Don Hunstein
 Reissue Design: Randall Martin
 Packaging Manager: John Christiana

Notes

References

1977 albums
Columbia Records albums
Maynard Ferguson albums